The England women's cricket team toured the West Indies in December 2022 to play three Women's One Day Internationals (WODIs) and five Women's Twenty20 Internationals (WT20Is). The WODI matches formed part of the 2022–2025 ICC Women's Championship.

England won the first ODI by 142 runs, helped by an innings of 90 runs from Nat Sciver and four-wicket haul from Charlie Dean. The second ODI saw England win by the same margin, with Lauren Bell taking four wickets. England completed a 3–0 series sweep after beating the hosts by 151 runs in the final ODI.

England began the T20I series with a comfortable win, successfully chasing down the West Indies score of 105/7 inside 13 overs. No West Indian batters scored more than 18 in the second match, which was again won by the tourists. England sealed the series with a 17-run victory in the third match. The fourth match was also won by England, this time by a comfortable margin of 49 runs. West Indies were bowled out for only 43 runs in the fifth and final T20I, which was their lowest total in the format. England won the match by 8 wickets to confirm a 5–0 series victory.

Squads

Alice Capsey was ruled out of the remainder  of the tour after sustaining a broken collarbone during the first ODI. Maia Bouchier and Alice Davidson-Richards were added to England's T20I squad as a result. Kyshona Knight replaced the injured Karishma Ramharack in the West Indies' squad for the 3rd ODI. Before the start of the T20I series, Freya Kemp was ruled out of England's squad because of a back injury. It was later announded that Kemp had been diagnoses with a stress fracture in her back, that also ruled her out of the 2023 ICC Women's T20 World Cup. Kyshona Knight replaced the injured Chinelle Henry in West Indies' squad for the final T20I.

WODI series

1st WODI

2nd WODI

3rd WODI

WT20I series

1st WT20I

2nd WT20I

3rd WT20I

4th WT20I

5th WT20I

Notes

References

External links
 Series home at ESPNcricinfo

2022 in West Indian cricket
2022 in English cricket
2022 in English women's cricket
International cricket competitions in 2022–23
2022-23
England 2022-23